Derek Gerald Lee (born July 28, 1966) is a retired Major League Baseball outfielder who appeared in 15 games for the Minnesota Twins during the 1993 season. Listed at 6' 1", 200 lb., Lee batted left-handed and threw right-handed. He was born in Chicago, Illinois.

Lee played for the State College of Florida and the University of South Florida and was drafted by four teams from 1985–1987, but did not sign with any of them. In 1986, he played collegiate summer baseball for the Falmouth Commodores of the Cape Cod Baseball League (CCBL). In 1987, he returned to the CCBL and played for the Harwich Mariners, hitting a key game-winning home run in the league championship series to help Harwich to the league title.

Lee finally signed with the Chicago White Sox after being selected in the 1988 MLB Draft. He then was claimed off waivers by the Twins in 1992, and was brought up to the major-league club for about one month. The following offseason, he was sent to the Montreal Expos  in exchange for a minor leaguer.

In between, Lee played winter ball with the Caribes de Oriente club of the Venezuelan Professional Baseball League.

Sources

1966 births
Living people
American expatriate baseball players in Canada
American expatriate baseball players in Mexico
Baseball players from Chicago
Birmingham Barons players
Caribes de Oriente players
American expatriate baseball players in Venezuela
Diablos Rojos del México players
Edmonton Trappers players
Falmouth Commodores players
Harwich Mariners players
Las Vegas Stars (baseball) players
Leones de Yucatán players
Major League Baseball outfielders
Minnesota Twins players
Norfolk Tides players
Oklahoma City 89ers players
Ottawa Lynx players
Portland Beavers players
Rochester Red Wings players
SCF Manatees baseball players
Schaumburg Flyers players
South Bend White Sox players
South Florida Bulls baseball players
Texas Rangers scouts
Utica Blue Sox players
Vancouver Canadians players
State College of Florida, Manatee–Sarasota alumni
African-American baseball players